Janardhanan Nair (born 5 May 1946) is an Indian actor, producer and a former Indian Airforce personnel who predominantly acts in Malayalam films. He acted in his first feature film Adyathe Kadha, directed by K. S. Sethumadhavan in 1971, he acted in more than 700 films. He started his career when Malayalam films were made in black and white. He is known for his style of handling humour and his iconic voice. He started his career playing brusque villains and sub hero roles in the 1970s and early 1980s, acting along with Prem Nazir and Jayan, but later established himself as a highly sought-after comedian.

The turning point of his career was his role in the 1988 film Oru CBI Diary Kurippu, which brought out his comic skills. However, he was typecast as a comedian only after the 1993 film Meleparambil Aanveedu. Mimicry artists perform with his noted role of Garvasis Aashan in Mannar Mathai Speaking (1995). But along with comic roles, he had done serious roles like D.I.G Marar in Dhruvam and Jayashankar in Mafia. Apart from stereotyped Hindu/Muslim/Christian characters, he has the distinction of portraying a Sikh and a Jewish character.

Personal life

Janardhanan was born in the village of Ullala near Vaikom in May 5, 1946 to Kollarakkattu Veettil Paravoor K. Gopala Pillai and Gouri Amma, as their youngest son. He has four brothers and three sisters. He had his primary education from NSS High School, Vechoor and pre-university from NSS Hindu College, Changanacherry. Later, he joined the Indian Air force for a short period. After two years  in 1967, he joined Veluthampi Memorial N S S College, Dhanuachapuram Neyyattinkara for B. Com.  He debuted in a Family Planning documentary Prathisanthi, directed by Adoor Gopalakrishnan, recommended by lecturer Sreevaraham Balakrishnan. He turned down the offer of bank employment and became Production Manager for Chemparathi, produced by S. K. Nair and directed by P. N. Menon. After that, he worked with Kakkanadan and V. B. C. Nair for Malayalanadu weekly. Then SK Nair sent him to Madras to take charge in his Madras office.  While working there, he got an opportunity to act in Aadhyathe Katha in 1972.

He is married to Vijayalaksmi and they have two daughters: Rema Ranjini and Laxmi.

Filmography

Actor

 Adyathe Katha (1971) as Mohan
 Chembarathi (1972) as Vinayan
 Gayathri (1973)
 Mazhakaru (1973) as Soman
 Chukku (1973)
 Udayam Kizhakku Thanne (1974)
 Bhoogolam Thiriyunnu (1974)
 Moham (1974)
 Swami Ayappan (1975)
 Ulsavam (1975) as Ouseppu
 Penpada (1975) as Panicker
 Chalanam (1975)
 Priyamulla Sophiya (1975)
 Njan Ninne Premikkunnu (1975)
 Sathyathinte Nizhalil (1975)
 Omanakunju (1975)
 Odakuzhal (1975)
 Love Letter (1975)
 Prasadam (1975)
 Cheenavala (1975) as Rowdy Pachan
 Abhinandanam (1976)
 Mallanum Mathevanum (1976)
 Ponni (1976)
 Prasadam (1976) as Sukumaran
 Ozhikkinethire (1976)
 Chennay Valrthiya Kutti (1976)
 Anavaranam (1976)
 Missi (1976)
 Ayakkari (1976) as Mathew
 Anjali (1977)
 Kannappanunni (1977) as Pachan
 Muttathe Mulla (1977) as Ramesh
 Agninakshathram (1977)
 Harshabashppam (1977)
 Makam Piranna Manka (1977)
 Saritha (1977)
 Ivanente Priyaputhran (1977)
 Veedu Oru Swargam (1977)
 Innale Innu (1977) 
 Anabdham paramandham (1977)
 Acharam Ammini Osaram Omana (1977) as Ravikumar
 Snehikkan Samayilla (1978)
 Arum Anyaralla (1978) as Baby
 Avalkku Maranamilla (1978)
 Velluvili (1978) as Sreedharan
 Yagaswam (1978)
 Vadakakkoru Hridayam (1978)
 Snehathinte Mukhagal (1978)
 Iniyum Puzhayozhukum (1978) as Suku
 Randu Pennkuttikal (1978) 
 Avalude Ravukal (1978) 
 Kadathanattu Makkam (1978)
 Mukkuvane Snehicha Bhootham (1978) as Lopez
 Bandham (1978)
 Kanyaka (1978) as Raghavan
 Vyamoham (1978) 
 Aravam (1978) as Anthony
 Vayanadan Thampan  (1978) 
 Kudumbam Namukku Sreekovil (1978) as Venugopal
 Eeta (1978) as Koruthu
 Vijayam Nammude Senani (1979)
 Ezhu Nirangal (1979) as Radhakrishnan
 Hridayathil Nee Matram (1979)
 Ini Yatra (1979) 
 Indradhanussu (1979) as Sub Inspector Babu
 Prabhatha Sandhya(1979) as Kutty Sankaran
 Vijayanum Veeranum (1979) as Prakash
 Lillypookkal (1979)
 Jimmi (1979) as Babu Paul
 Simhasanam (1979) 
 Ithaa Oru Theeram (1979) as Chandran
 Valeduthavan Valal (1979) 
 Vellayani Paramu (1979) aa Sarvadhi Swami
 Yakshiparu (1979) 
 Sandhyaragam (1979) 
 Jeevitam Oru Gaanam (1979) as Varghese
 Ezhamkadalinakkare (1979) as Raghu
 Ashwaradham (1980)
 Sathyam (1980) as Balraj
 Theenalangal (1980) as Madhavan, Rajasekharan (double role)
 Itha Oru Theeram (1980) 
 Aagamanam (1980) as Murali
 Saraswathiyamam (1980) 
 Dwik Vijayam (1980) as Pankajakshan
 Idimuzhkkam (1980) 
 Palattu Kunjikannan (1980)
 Chandrahasam (1980) as Balan
 Ragham Thanam Pallavi (1980)
 Avan oru Ahamkari (1980) 
 Kadalkattu (1980) 
 Manushya Mrugam (1980) as Chandran
 Ellam Ninakku Vendi (1981) as Somarajan
 Ambalpoovu (1981)
 Tharattu (1981)
 IthiHasam (1981) 
 Itha Oru Dhikkari (1981) as Koyikkal Kuruppu
 NiyalYudham (1981) 
 Ariyappedatha Rahasyam (1981) as Pappan
 Snehapoorvam Meera (1982) as Baby
 Marupacha (1982) as Janardhanan
 Njan Ekananu (1982) as Raghu
 Keni (1982) 
 Postmortem (1982) as Unni
 Ethiralikal (1982) as Hamsa
 Sharam (1982)
 Ayudham (1982)
 Mylanchi (1982) as Moideen
 Arambam (1982) as Lazar
 Njan Ekananu (1982) as Raghu
 Ithiri Neram Othiri Karyam (1982) as Shekharan
 Samrambham
 Pourusham (1983)
 Ankam (1983)
 Nanayam (1983)
 Ee Yugam (1983)
 Bandham (1983)
 Arabikkadal (1983) 
 Naanayam (1983) as Vasu
 Iniyenkilum (1983) as Kariyachan
 Unaroo (1984)
 Oru Kochu Swapnam (1984)
 Uyarangalil (1984) as A. K. Menon
 Lakshmana Rekha (1984) as Balachandra Menon
 Kudumbam Oru Swargam Bharya Oru Devatha (1984) as Paul
 Kadamattathachan as Aliyar
 Aksharanal (1984)
 Ivide Thudangunnu (1984)
 Adiyozhukkukal (1984) as Hamsa
 Aalkkoottathil Thaniye (1984) as Balachandran
 Uyarthezhunelpu (1985) as Anand
 Pournami Ravil (1985)
 Idanilangal (1985)
 Mukhyamanthri (1985) as Pappachan
 Mulamoottil Adima (1985) as Ibrahim
 Janakeeya Kodathi (1985) as Janardanan
 Anu Bandham (1985) as Police Officer
 Kathodu Kathoram (1985) as Lazar
 Kattukulle Thiruvizha (TAMIL)
 Sukhamo Devi (1986) as Ouseppachan
 Koodanayum Kaattu (1986)
 Abhayam Thedi (1986)
 Gandhinagar 2nd Street (1986)
 Niramulla Raavukal (1986) as Kumaran
 Yuvajanotsavam (1986) as Unnithan
 Cabaret Dancer (1986)
 Amme Bagavathi (1986)
 Pournami Rathriyil (1986)
 Nimishangal (1986) as S.P. Damodharan Pillai
 Aavanazhi (1986) as Vincent
 Ee Kaikalil (1986) as Madhava Menon
 Vrutham (1987) as Avarachan
 Nadodikkattu (1987) as Kovai Venkatesan
 Irupatham Noottandu (1987)
 Unnikale Oru Kadha Parayam (1987)
 Kalarathri (1987)
 Mangalya Charthu (1987) as Kuruppu
 Thoranam (1987)
 Itha Samayamayi (1987)
 Sreedharante Onnam Thirumurivu (1987) as Ramachandran
 Adimakal Udamakal (1987) as Ramachandran
 Aankiliyude Tharattu (1987) as Stanley
 Moonnam Mura (1988) as Mathews
 Oru CBI Diary Kurippu (1988) as Ouseppachan
 Abkari (1988) as Karthikeyan
 August 1 (1988) as Kaimal
 Karate Girls (1988)
 Evidence (1988)
 Nineteen Twenty One (1988)
 Thanthram (1988) as Adv. Rajasekharan
 Mukthi (1988) as Shekharan Nair
 Aksharathettu (1989) as Regional Manager
 Varavelpu (1989) as Kumaran
 Vandanam (1989)
 Pradeshika Vaarthakal (1989)
 News (1989) as Radhakrishnan
 Naduvazhikal (1989) as Aasan
 Kali Karyamaai: Crime Branch (1989) as Charukeshan
 Prabhatham Chuvanna Theruvil (1988)
 Adhipan (1989)
 Charithram (1989)
 Adikkurippu (1989) as William
 Jagratha (1989) as Ouseppachan
 Randam Varavu (1990) as Police Officer
 Nagarangalil Chennu Raparkam (1990) as Rambo Chackochan
 Kuruppinte Kanakku Pustakom (1990) as Beena's Uncle
 Kadathanadan Ambadi (1990)
 Maydinam (1990)
 Lalsalam (1990)
 Nammude Naadu (1990) as Joseph
 Arhatha (1990) as Krishnakumar
 Appu (1990) as Janardhana Kaimal
 No. 20 Madras Mail (1990) as Advocate Thomas Mathew
 Nattuvishesham (1991) as Kattumooppan
 Maydinam  (1991) as Chachappan
 Kilukkampetti (1991) as Managing Director
 Godfather (1991) as Gopi
 Georgekutty C/O Georgekutty (1991)
 Advaitham (1991) as Krishnan Kutty Menon
 Nayam Vyakthamakkunnu (1991) as Chackochan
 Adayalam (1991)
 Mayaunna Manasukal (1992)
 Soorya Gayathri (1992) as Babu Karunakaran
 Poochakkaru Manikettum (1992)
 Adthvaidam (1992)
 Sathyaprathinjna (1992)
 Kizhakkan Pathrose (1992)
 Aparatha (1992) as Phalgunan
 Sadayam (1992) as Police Officer
 Ootty Pattanam (1992) as Menon
 My Dear Muthachan (1992) as Advocate Ananthan
 Ennodishtam Koodamo (1992) as Arathi's Uncle
 Adharam (1992) as Krishna Menon
 Thalasthanam (1992) as C.M
 Sarovaram (1993)
 Porutham (1993)
 Aacharyan (1993) as Raveendranath
 Varam (1993)
 Sthalathe Pradhana Payyans (1993) as Govinda Menon
 Midhunam (1993) as Sivasankaran
 Meleparambil Aanveedu (1993) as Kannappan (Ammavan)
 Maya Mayuram (1993)
 Kabuliwala (1993) as 'Minnal' Thomachan
 Janam (1993) as K. Divakaran
 Ekalavyan (1993) as Krishnan
 Devasuram (1993) as Kunjikrishnan Nambiar
 Dhruvam (1993) as D.I.G. Marar
 Valtsalyam (1993) as Ramankutty Menon
 Mafia (1993) as Jayashankar
 Palayam (1993) as Lawrence
 Vardhakya Puranam (1994) as Cherian Thomas
 Vadhu Doctoranu (1994) as Sankaran
 Poochakkaru Mani Kettum (1994)
 Pingami (1994) as Koshy Varghese
 Pidakkozhi Koovunna Noottandu (1994) as Vishnu Narayanan Potty
 Varanamaalyam (1994) as Thomas
 Rajadhani (1994) 
 Kaboolivala (1994)
 Kinnaripuzhayoram (1994)
 CID Unnikrishnan B.A., B.Ed. (1994) as Rishikeshan Nair
 Bheesmacharya (1994) as Madhavan Nair
 Vishnu (1994) as Divakaran
 Highway (1995) 
 No 1 Snehatheeram Bangalore North (1995)
 Sundari Neeyum Sundaran Njanum (1995)
 Achan Rajavu Appan Jethavu (1995)
 Parvathy Parinayam (1995)
 Minnaminuginum Minnukettu (1995)
 Tom & Jerry (1995) as Chachan
 Three Men Army (1995) as K. R. G. Menon
 Thacholi Varghese Chekavar (1995) as Mathukutty
 Sindoora Rekha (1995) as Narayanan Nair
 Puthukottyile Puthu Manavalan (1995) as Palathara Palunni
 Pai Brothers (1995) as Kesavan
 Mannar Mathai Speaking (1995) as Garvasees Ashan
 Mangalam Veettil Manaseswari Gupta (1995) as Achuthankutty
 Kidilol Kidilam (1995) as Karunakara Kuruppu
 Kalamasseriyil Kalyanayogam (1995) as Kalamassery Krishnan Nair
 Kaatttile Thadi Thevarude Ana (1995) as Alexander
 Avittam Thirunaal Aarogya Sriman (1995) as Phalgunan
 Aniyan Bava Chetan Bava (1995) as Kottaram Veedan
 Aadyathe Kanmani (1995) as Unnithan
 Mimics Super 1000 (1996)u
 Swapna Lokathe Balabhaskaran (1996) as Sadashivan
 Parasala Pachan Payannur Paramu (1996)
 Mookkilla Rajyathu Murimookkan Rajavu (1996)
 Manthrika Kuthira (1996)
 Kanjirapally Kariachan (1996)
 The Good Boys (1997) as Mohanachandran
 Superman (1997) as Nithya's Valyachan
 Kilikurussiyile Kudumbamela (1997)
 Poonilamazha (1997)
 Kottapurathe Koottukudumbam (1997) as Bharathan Pillai
 Oru Mutham Mani Mutham (1997)
 Poomarathanalil (1997) as Fernandez
 Vamsam (1997)
 Anjarakalyanam (1997)
 Junior Mandrake (1997)
 The Car (1997) as Kumarettan
 Kilukil Pambaram (1997)
 Karunyam (1997) as K. K. Nair
 Kadhanayakan (1997) as Sathrughnan Pillai
 Hitler Brothers (1997) as Thrivikraman
 Aniyathi Pravu (1997) as Dr. Kuttappayi
 Varnapakittu (1997) as Ramaswamy Iyer
 Summer in Bethlehem (1998) as Colonel C.R. Menon
 Punjabi House (1998) as Manninder Singh
 Meenathil Thalikettu (1998) as Kunjiraman
 Mayilpeelikkavu (1998)
 Gloria Fernandez From USA (1998)
 Ormacheppu (1998)
 Vazhunnor (1999) as Thevakattu Avarachan
 Vasantiyum Lakshmiyum Pinne Njanum (1999)
 Ustaad (1999) as Swamy
 Pathram (1999) as Kuruvithadam Baby
 Njangal Santhushtaranu (1999) as Idikkula Ittoopp
 Parashala PAchan Payannur Paramu (1999)
 American Ammayi (1999)
 James Bond (1999) as Kunnamkulam Rappai
 Friends (1999) as Madhava Varma
 F.I.R (1999) as Chief Minister
 Crime File (1999) as Kaliyar Pathrose Vaidyan
 Chandamama (1999) as Thampy
 Sathyam Shivam Sundaram (2000)
 Pilots (2000)
 Mr. Butler (2000)
 Sayamvarapanthal (2000)
 Dreamz (2000)
 Mark Antony(2000) as Parel Pappu
 Devadoothan (2000) as Principal
 Darling Darling (2000) as Unnithan
 Daivathinte Makan (2000) (as Janardhan)
 Saivar Thirumeni (2001) as Father Kuruvithadam
 Randam Bhavam (2001) as D. I. G. of Police
 Naranathu Thampuran (2001)
 Ee Ravil (2001)
 Rakshasa Rajavu (2001)
 Nagaravadhu (2001) as Kesari Govinda Pillai
 Dubai (2001) as K. J. Nair
 Karumadikkuttan (2001) as Govindan Nair
 Andolanam (2001)
 Narendran Makan Jayakanthan Vaka (2001) as Balakrishnan Nambiar
 Nariman (2001) as Chief Minister Shekharan
 One Man Show (2001) as Raveendran
 Kathuchempakam (2002)
 Kadha (2002)
 Thandavam (2002) as Menon
 Snehithan (2002) as Vivek's father
 Kuberan (2002) as Vasan
 Kayamkulam Kanaran (2002)
 Kaiyethum Doorath (2002) as passenger in the boat
 Chirikkudukka (2002) as Prahaladhan Pillai
 Bamboo Boys (2002) as Mula Swamy
 Chronic Bachelor (2003) as Parameswaran Pillai
 Sadanante Samayam (2003)
 Gramaphone (2003) as Gregory
 Swapnam Kondu Thulabharam (2003) as Madhavan Thampi
 Melvilasam Sariyanu (2003) as Menon
 Mizhi Randilum (2003) as Thampi
 Ivar (2003) as S. K. Nair
 Valathottu Thirinjal Nalamathe Veedu (2003) as Ajith's uncle
 Thalamelam (2004) as Kochousepp
 Kottaram Vaidyan (2004) as Marthandan
 Vamanapuram Bus Route (2004) as Bahuleyan
 Sethurama Iyer CBI (2004) as Ouseppachan
 Udayam (2004) as Krishna Menon
 Njaan Salperu Raman Kutty (2004) as Narayanan
 Kanninum Kannadikkum (2004) as Narayanan
 Chathikkatha Chanthu (2004) as Thampuran
 Vettam (2004) as Fernandes
 Natturajavu (2004) as Father Pappy
 Black (2004) as Aasan
 Kadhavaseshan (2004)
 Five Fingers (2005) as Father Nedumbaran
 Udayananu Tharam (2005) (as Janardhan) as Madhumathi's father
 Immini Nalloraal (2005) as Bhaskara Pillai
 Thommanum Makkalum (2005) as Panikkar
 Alice in Wonderland (2005) as Mani Kuruvilla
 Rappakal (2005) as Sankaran Kuttiyar
 The Tiger (2005) as Ahamed Sahib
 Jayam (2006)
 Madhuchandralekha (2006)
 Rashtram (2006) as Keshava Menon
 Kilukkam Kilukilukkam (2006) as Sankaran Potty
 Thuruppu Gulan (2006) as Peethambaran
 Chess (2006) as Easwara Varma
 Nottam (2006) as Menon
 Red Salute (2006)
 Pathaka (2006) as Mohammad
 Kanaka Simhasanam (2006)
 Inspector Garud (2007) as Krishnan Namboothiri
 Paranju Theeratha Visheshangal (2007) as Raghavan Nair
 Panthaya Kozhi (2007) as Sankaran Nair
 Khaki (2007) as Bahuleyan
 July 4 (2007) as Lokanathan
 Hallo (2007) as M. N. Nambiar
 Nazrani (2007) as Thampi
 Magic Lamp (2008) as Anandan
 Dae! Ingottu Nokkiye as (2008)
 Raudram (2008) as Chief Minister
 College Kumaran (2008) as V Narendranath
 Malabar Wedding (2008) as Paappan
 Annan Thambi (2008) as Ravunni
 Mayabazar (2008) as Kuriayachan
 Crazy Gopalan (2008)
 Kadha, Samvidhanam Kunchakko (2009) as Chief Minister
 Aayirathil Oruvan (2009/II) (uncredited) as Eenasu
 Sanmanasullavan Appukuttan (2009) as Lambodharan Pilla
 Samastha Keralam PO (2009)
 Oru Black and White Kudumbam (2009)
 Utharaswayamvaram (2009)
 Moz n Cat (2009)
 Seetha kalyanam (2009)
 Makante Achan (2009)
 Love In Singapore (2009)
 2 Harihar Nagar (2009)
 Ee Pattanathil Bhootham (2009) as Philipose
 Loudspeaker (2009) as Grandpa
 Chattambinaadu (2009) as Vadival Vasu
 Bodyguard (2010)
 Annarakkannanum Thannalayathu (2010) as Muthupandi Chettiar
 Bombay Mittayi (2010)
 Kaaryasthan (2010)
 Malarvady Arts Club (2010)
 Mummy And Me (2010)
 Pramani (2010) as Castro Vareeth
 Chekavar (2010) as P.M.V.
 Elsamma Enna Aankutty (2010) as Balan Pillai
 Lavender (2011)
 Violin (2011)
 Maharaja Talkies (2011)
 Lucky Jokers (2011)
 Nadakame Ulakam (2011)
 Venicile Vyapari (2011) as Raghuramavarma
 Mullassery Madhavan Kutty Nemom P. O. (2012)
 The King & the Commissioner (2012) as Central Minister G. K
 Trivandrum Lodge (2012) 
 Madhirashi (2012)
 Karmayodha (2012) as Narayana Menon
 Naughty Professor (2012)
 Ee Thirakkinidayil (2012)
 Theevram (2012) as S.P Varma
 Namukku Parkkan as Krishnan Ammavan
 Thiruvambadi Thamban (2012)
 Proprietors: Kammath & Kammath (2013)
 Nadodimannan as Damodharan
 Black butterfly (2013)
 Caribbeans (2013) as C.M
 Vallatha Pahayan (2013)
 KQ (2013)
 Mannar Mathai Speaking 2 (2014)
 Ettekaal Second (2014)
 Konthayum Poonoolum (2014)
 Bhaskar The Rascal (2015)
 Utopiayile Rajavu (2015)
 Savam (2016)
 Fukri (2017)
 Georgettans Pooram (2017)
 Rakshadhikari Baiju Oppu (2017)
 Lava Kusha (2017)
 Masterpiece (2017)
 Captain (2018)
 Panchavarnathatha (2018)
 Abrahaminte Santhathikal (2018)
 Oru Yamandan Premakadha (2019)
 Vishudha Pusthakam(2019)
 Pattabhiraman (2019) as Varma
 Jack & Daniel (2019) as Kerala CM
 Big Brother(2020) as Valliyammavan
 Kaduva (2022) as Chief Minister Ananthanathan
 Paappan (2022) as Dr.Pattabhiraman
 Christopher (2023) as Cheif Minister

As dubbing artist

Television
Mahathma Gandhi colony (Asianet)
Ashtapadi (Surya TV)
Kanthari
Badai Bungalow (Asianet)
Adutha Bellodu Koodi (Zee Keralam)

References

External links
 
 Janardhanan at MSI

Male actors from Kerala
People from Vaikom
Living people
1946 births
Male actors in Malayalam cinema
Indian male film actors
20th-century Indian male actors
21st-century Indian male actors
Male actors in Malayalam television
Indian male television actors
Indian male comedians